WMDH-FM (102.5 MHz), branded as "Nash FM 102.5", is a radio station licensed to New Castle, Indiana, and serves the Muncie-Marion, Indiana, radio market with a country music format. This station operates at an effective radiated power of 50,000 watts under ownership of Cumulus Media.  Studios are located in New Castle with tower facilities located between New Castle and Muncie near the Delaware/Henry County line. On September 6, 2013, WMDH dropped the "Hit Country 102.5 WMDH" branding and became "Nash FM 102.5."

Current Schedule:

 NASH Mornings Live with Jeff Reynolds (Weekdays: 6 - 10 AM)
 Mike Lees (Weekdays: 10 AM - 3 PM)
 Drive Home With Tater (Weekdays: 3 - 7 PM)
 Nights With Elaina (7 PM - 12 AM)
 Later with Lia (12 - 6 AM)
 Country Gold with Terri Clark ( Saturdays: 6 - 10 AM)
 American Country Countdown with Kix Brooks (Sundays: 9 AM - 1 PM)

Notable WMDH Alumni: 
 Bob Richards/VP of Programming WLHK, WIBC - Emmis Communications
 Chris Carter/GM WEEM
 Rick Daniels (formerly with WLBC, WXXC, WSTO, KQFC, KIZN)
 The Midnight Cowboy (Steve Baltimore) 1978-1984

Previous logo

References

External links
Nash FM 102.5 - Official Site

MDH-FM
Country radio stations in the United States
Cumulus Media radio stations